Robin Hood's Stride (also known as Mock Beggar's Mansion) is a rock formation on the Limestone Way in Derbyshire close to the village of Elton. The nearest town is Bakewell, to the north.  The popular tourist spot can be accessed via the Limestone Way just off the B5056 between Haddon Hall and Winster, or from the unclassified road from Alport to Elton using either the Limestone Way, a concessionary footpath or Access Land. Both options have limited parking at the side of the road.
It consists of gritstone boulders deeply seamed by water flows. Limited short climbing is possible; nearby Cratcliffe Tor provides more serious routes. The two "pinnacles" are Weasel pinnacle (eastern end; Diff) and Inaccessible pinnacle (west; V Diff). An ancient road, possibly prehistoric or Roman, the Derbyshire Portway (also known as Old Manchester Lane and The Chariot Way) passed close to the outcrop. Nearby is Nine Stones Close, a four-stone circle, and, at Cratcliffe Tor, a rock shelter known as the Hermit's Cave, containing a crucifix carving dated stylistically to the 13th or 14th century.

Robin Hood's Stride features in an episode of The Return of Sherlock Holmes and the film The Princess Bride (1987).

References

External links 
 snapthepeaks
 cressbrook.co.uk

Mountains and hills of the Peak District
Rock formations of England